Mingde may refer to:

Mingde (934–938), era name used by the Later Shu emperor Meng Zhixiang 
Mingde High School in Changsha, Hunan, China
Mingde Dam in Miaoli County, Taiwan
Mingde metro station in Beitou District, Taipei, Taiwan

See also
Empress Mingde (disambiguation)